Conostephium prolatum is a species of flowering plant in the family Ericaceae and is endemic to the south of Western Australia. It is an erect shrub usually with narrowly egg-shaped or narrowly triangular leaves with the narrower end toward the base, and more or less pendulous, spindle-shaped, cream to straw-coloured and dark purple flowers.

Description
The upper surface of the leaves is glabrous and shiny, the lower surface more or less glabrous but paler.

Taxonomy and naming
Conostephium prolatum was first formally described in 2013 by Michael Hislop in the journal Nuytsia from specimens he collected in the south of the Fitzgerald River National Park in 2011. The specific epithet (prolatum) means "lengthened" or "extended", referring to the leaves, which are longer than those of the similar C. roei.

Distribution and habitat
This species usually grows in near-coastal heath and is only known from the south-east of the Fitzgerald National Park in the Esperance Plains bioregion of southern Western Australia.

Conservation status
This conostephium is listed as "Priority Two" by the Western Australian Government Department of Biodiversity, Conservation and Attractions, meaning that it is poorly known and from only one or a few locations.

References

prolatum
Epacridoideae
Eudicots of Western Australia
Ericales of Australia
Endemic flora of Western Australia
Plants described in 2013